Mount Tabor is an unincorporated community in Bean Blossom Township, Monroe County, in the U.S. state of Indiana.

History
Mount Tabor was platted in 1828. The community was named directly or indirectly after Mount Tabor, in the Middle East. A post office was established at Mount Tabor in 1831, and remained in operation until it was discontinued in 1860.

Geography

References

Unincorporated communities in Monroe County, Indiana
Unincorporated communities in Indiana
Bloomington metropolitan area, Indiana